Writing Sampler was an unpublished work by the Danish philosopher Søren Kierkegaard. The pseudonymous author attached to the Sampler is A.B.C.D.E.F. Godthaab. Sampler was intended to be a sequel to the Prefaces which was published in 1844. It was translated and published posthumously in English in 1997.

Writing Sampler was intended to emphasize the ironic and satirical elements of the Prefaces. It is also a historical social commentary of life in Copenhagen in the 1840s, and it references people and events of note at the time. In particular, it focuses on the relationship between the esthetic and religious stages of life.

References

1997 books
Books by Søren Kierkegaard